Longyan Guanzhaishan Airport , is a dual-use military and public airport serving the city of Longyan, Fujian Province, China.

Location 
The airport is located in Liancheng County, and was formerly called Liancheng Airport. The airport has a handling capacity of 140,000 passengers and 800 tons of cargo. The airport was opened on April 25, 2004. 15,600 passengers passed through the airport in 2005.

Airlines and destinations

See also
List of airports in China

References

Airports in Fujian
Chinese Air Force bases
Longyan